This is a list of the Honoured Members of Hockey Heritage North:



A 

Al Arbour
George Armstrong
Fred Arthur
Larry Aurie
Bob Attwell
Ron Attwell

B 

Pete Babando
Mitch Babin
John Baby
Ralph Backstrom
Drew Bannister
Andy Barbe
Bill Barber
Bill Barilko
Baz Bastien
Ken Belanger
Danny Belisle
Neil Belland
Max Bennett
Todd Bertuzzi
Sam Bettio
Bob Blackburn
Dusty Blair
Toe Blake
Mike Bloom
Fred Boimistruck
Ivan Boldirev
Buddy Boone
Clarence Boucher
Randy Boyd
John Brenneman
Archie Briden
Stan Brown
Andrew Brunette
Mike Buchanan
Bobby Burns
Cummy Burton
Don Blackburn
Curt Blackenbury
Leo Bourgeault
David Brisebois

C 

Billy Cameron
Wayne Carleton
Randy Carlyle
Tom Cassidy
Jonathan Cheechoo
Real Chevrefils
Marc Chorney
Roy Conacher
Wayne Connelly
Hal Cooper
Les Costello
Larry Courville
Billy Coutu
Danny Cox
Terry Crisp
Gary Croteau
Troy Crowder
Jim Culhane
Floyd Curry
Bryan Campbell
Rob Cook
Murray Costello
Darcy Coulson

D 

Matt D'Agostini
Marc D'Amour
Dan Daoust
Norm Defelice
Guy Delparte
Joffre Desilets
Gerry Desjardins
Paul DiPietro
Babe Donnelly
Shean Donovan
Kent Douglas
Dave Downie
Dick Duff
Ron Duguay
Art Duncan
Craig Duncanson
Bob Dupuis
Bill Durnan
Jack Dyte
Greg de Vries
Ab DeMarco, Jr.
Ab DeMarco, Sr.
Armand Demonte
Peter Driscoll
John Duran
Lloyd Doran

E 

Jack Egers
Bo Elik
Phil Esposito
Tony Esposito

F 

Drew Fata
Rico Fata
Brian Finley
Alvin Fisher
Bob Fitchner
John Flesch
Mike Foligno
Dave Fortier
Jim Fox
Ron Francis
Dan Frawley
Lou Farelli

G 

Pierre Gagne
Sean Gagnon
Ray Gariepy
Art Gauthier
Sean Gauthier
Aaron Gavey
Ed Giacomin
Mike Gillis
Claude Giroux
Ray Giroux
Tony Graboski
Bob Gracie
John Grisdale
Don Grosso
Bep Guidolin
Paul Gagne
Redvers Green
Wilfred Green

H 

Murray Hall
Trevor Halverson
Chuck Hamilton
Dave Hannan
Gord Hannigan
Pat Hannigan
Ray Hannigan
Paul Harrison
Shawn Heaphy
Earl Heiskala
Bryan Helmer
Alex Henry
Floyd Hillman
Larry Hillman
Wayne Hillman
Jim Hofford
Randy Holt
George Horne
Tim Horton
Al Huggins
James Hughes
Conrad Hache
Robert Hamill
Gary Holt
Pete Horeck

I 

Joe Ironstone

J 

Cole Jarrett
Bob Jones
Jim Jones
Claude Julien

K 

Gord Kannegiesser
Sheldon Kannegiesser
Duke Keats
Larry Keenan
Pep Kelly
Tyler Kennedy
Joe Klukay
Jerry Korab

L 

Leo Labine
Yvon Labre
Bob LaForest
Mark LaForest
Marc Laforge
Leo Lafrance
Jason Lafreniere
Hec Lalande
Denny Lambert
Marc Lamothe
Claude Larose
Kevin LaVallee
Al LeBrun
Mike Leggo
Roger Lemelin
Rick Lessard
Don Lever
Ted Lindsay
Lonnie Loach
Howard Lockhart
Dave Lowry
Adelard Lafrance
Leo Lamoureux
Charlie Langlois
Joe Levandoski

M 

Kilby MacDonald
Derek MacKenzie
Bernie MacNeil
Frank Mahovlich
Pete Mahovlich
Jim Mair
Chico Maki
Wayne Maki
Troy Mallette
Moe Mantha, Jr.
Bud Maracle
Hector Marini
Willie Marshall
Grant Martin
Dick Mattiussi
Paul Maurice
Bryan Maxwell
Jim Mayer
Jim McBurney
Ted McCaskill
Bob McCord
Dale McCourt
Dan McCourt
Bill McCreary, Sr.
Keith McCreary
John McCreedy
Bill McDonagh
Bucko McDonald
Mike McEwen
Alex McKinnon
Steve McLaren
Kurtis McLean
John McLellan
Gerry McNamara
Hillary Menard
Howie Menard
Mike Moher
Doug Mohns
Gus Mortson
Grant Mulvey
Paul Mulvey
Bob Murdoch
Jack Markle
Gerry Munro

N 

Lou Nanne
Rumun Ndur
Bob Nevin
Graeme Nicolson
Claude Noel
Ted Nolan
Dave Newell

O 

Gerry Odrowski

P 

Rosaire Paiement
Wilf Paiement
Pete Palangio
Jim Pappin
Jean-Paul Parise
Marty Pavelich
Fred Perlini
Brian Perry
Barclay Plager
Bill Plager
Bob Plager
Tony Poeta
Nick Polano
Dave Poulin
Ray Powell
Dean Prentice
Eric Prentice
Noel Price
Daren Puppa
Matt Pavelich
Didier Pitre
Nels Podolski
Joel Prpic
Dave Pulkkinen

Q 

None currently

R 

Matt Ravlich
Dick Redmond
Mickey Redmond
Bill Regan
Larry Regan
Ken Richardson
Gerry Rioux
Craig Rivet
Eddie Rodden
Dale Rolfe
Art Ross
Sam Rothschild

S 

Bob Sabourin
Brian Savage
Norm Schmidt
Ron Schock
Laurie Scott
Al Secord
Dan Seguin
Eddie Shack
Steve Shields
Richard Shulmistra
Chris Simon
Alex Singbush
John Sleaver
Brian Smith
Carl Smith
Nakina Smith
Gordon Spence
Irv Spencer
Frank St. Marseille
Allan Stanley
Bud Stefanski
Jeremy Stevenson
Steve Sullivan
Bob Sykes
Don Sylvestri
Bob Sloan
Zach Stortini

T 

Dave Tataryn
Greg Theberge
Floyd Thomson
Jerry Toppazzini
Zellio Toppazzini
Brent Tremblay
Marty Turco
Darren Turcotte
Dave Taylor
Chris Thorburn
Walt Tkaczuk
Jean-Guy Trudel
Tyler Kennedy

U 

Gene Ubriaco

V 

Eric Vail
Dennis Vial

W 

Bob Walton
Mike Walton
Jason Ward
Dave Watson
Jim Watson
John Webster
Tom Webster
Kenny Wharram
Kay Whitmore
Sean Whyte
Jim Wiemer
Jim Wiley
Rod Willard
Rob Wilson
Steve Wojciechowski
Stephen Walkom
Ron Wicks

X 

None currently

Y 

None currently

Z 

Mike Zuke

References 
 

Lists of National Hockey League players